Estadio Francisco Cabasés, popularly known as La Boutique, is a stadium in Córdoba, Argentina. Located in Barrio Jardín, it is  the home ground for C.A. Talleres. The stadium holds 13,000 people.

The stadium was named after the first member of the club, Francisco Paco Cabasés. The nickname Boutique refers to its small and elegant design.

References

External links
Stadium information 

b
Talleres de Córdoba
Sports venues in Córdoba Province, Argentina